Yaroslav Startsev (born 20 November 1988) is a Russian sport shooter.

He participated at the 2018 ISSF World Shooting Championships, winning a medal.

References

External links

Living people
1988 births
Russian male sport shooters
Skeet shooters